The Horne Section is a British musical comedy band, appearing sporadically on radio, television, podcast, and stage. Led by frontman and comedian Alex Horne, the band mix music with comedy and specialise in comedy/spoof songs as well as performing a wide variety of genres including jazz. The band is made up of professional musicians, including two childhood friends of Horne, and first performed together in May 2010, with the current line-up finalised during 2012. The Horne Section have performed at the Edinburgh Festival, as well as touring the UK, and celebrity guests at their shows have included Harry Hill, Simon Amstell, Jimmy Carr, Tim Minchin, Josie Long, Al Murray and John Oliver as well as musicians including Suggs and Neil Hannon. Their BBC Radio 4 series – Alex Horne presents The Horne Section – ran for three series from 2012 to 2014. The band have also released five albums of songs which are available via the group's Bandcamp page.

The band featured in The Horne Section Christmas, a nine-minute Christmas-carol themed TV special, shown on Sky Arts in December 2015 as part of a festive season of comedy shows. In April 2018 they recorded a two-hour live show at the London Palladium entitled The Horne Section Television Programme, featuring celebrity guests including Sue Perkins and Nadine Coyle, and broadcast on UK TV channel Dave on 24 May 2018. 
A Channel 4 six-part programme The Horne Section TV Show was released 3 November, 2022, and is a mostly scripted comedy about the band, combining elements of musical comedy, talk show and sitcom.

Horne and the band have often appeared on Channel 4's 8 Out of 10 Cats Does Countdown as the dictionary corner guest, performing various songs and jokes, and have chaired the BBC Two comedy/music quiz Never Mind the Buzzcocks in November 2012. The Horne Section were the 'house band' for Channel 4's The Last Leg of the Year on New Year's Eve 2018, 2019, 2020 and 2021, where they contributed backing music as well as playing a number of their own songs. They provided music for The Last Leg: Locked Down Under and Peter Crouch: Save Our Summer in 2020 and joined Peter Crouch again in 2021 for Crouchy's Year-Late Euros: Live. The band created the theme music for Horne's Taskmaster TV show, as well as for The Guardians cricket podcast The Spin.

The Horne Section Podcast has run from 2018 until 2021. It was in the top 10 most streamed podcasts from the Deezer platform in 2018, and in April 2019 it was nominated in the ‘Best Comedy’ category of the British Podcast Awards. The podcast has featured a range of guests including comedians (Greg Davies, Roisin Conaty, Sara Pascoe, Nish Kumar, Adam Buxton), presenters (Richard Osman, Susie Dent, Angellica Bell), sportspeople (Chris Hoy, Lizzy Yarnold), performance poets (Rob Auton, Tim Key, Scroobius Pip), and musicians (Jessie Ware, David Arnold, Robbie Williams). Each episode consists of light-hearted banter with the guest interspersed with comedic songs written and performed by the group.

Album discography 
These albums (and the single Grandaddy) are available to download at the group's Bandcamp page. The third album was released on 5 June 2020 featuring songs from the isolation podcasts. The band also have a Patreon page where listeners can commission short songs and shout-outs.

Alex Horne Presents The Horne Section
Alex Horne Presents The Horne Section was a BBC Radio 4 show that ran from 2011 to 2014 and was broadcast in the 6.30pm weekday comedy slot. The programme followed a similar format to the live Edinburgh festival shows with Horne and the band performing songs and jokes in front of a live audience, with assistance from a special guest - usually from the world of comedy. The pianist during series 1 was former member Joe Stilgoe, and from series 2 onwards was Ed Sheldrake.

Series 1 (2012) 

A pilot episode was broadcast the year before the first series.

A bonus episode recorded from the Edinburgh Festival was broadcast later that year.

Series 2 (2013) 

A New Year's Eve Special episode was broadcast at the end of 2013.

Series 3 (2014)

Television appearances

8 Out of 10 Cats Does Countdown (2013-present) 

8 Out of 10 Cats Does Countdown is a panel show combining the longstanding Channel 4 game format of Countdown with the lively comedy style of 8 Out of 10 Cats. Each episode introduces a celebrity guest as an assistant to etymologist Susie Dent in 'dictionary corner'. Alex Horne was previously a guest on the main Countdown programme in 2008, and as the author of a book on 'Wordwatching' was a strong candidate for the role. More unusually, he brought his backing band, and The Horne Section contributed various comedy song (and dance) items to the show, as well as stylistic parodies of the 30-second Countdown music.

The Horne Section have appeared in a number of episodes (with one appearance as Rachel Riley's assistants) over the course of the show, listed below with reference to the 8 Out of 10 Cats Does Countdown episodes page. The saxophonist 'Pedro' (Pete Grogan) appeared where shown as a deputy for one of the wind players.

The Horne Section Television Programme (2018)
The Horne Section Television Programme was a two-hour special show recorded for UKTV in front of a live audience at the London Palladium on 18 April 2018. The show was subsequently broadcast on 24 May 2018 on the Dave channel. The show featured a number of guests performing with the band including Sara Pascoe, drag singer Le Gateau Chocolat, Nadine Coyle, Joe Wilkinson and Sue Perkins. The programme interspersed the live performance with supposed studio rehearsal footage in which Horne berates the band for their ability and refuses to allow certain songs to be part of the show.

The Last Leg: Locked Down Under (2020)
The band appeared in a regular guest slot to close each show of this special series of The Last Leg, originally shown on Fridays at 10pm on Channel 4 during May–June 2020. Though the show was broadcast live from the homes of the hosts in Britain and Australia and via livestream with the individual guests, each member of the band pre-recorded their musical and visual contributions which were combined into a music video. The songs chosen were variously new podcast material, parody, and reworked previous podcast material.

Peter Crouch: Save Our Summer (2020)
The eight-part BBC series Peter Crouch: Save Our Summer was planned during the time of Coronavirus isolation to "bring the biggest names from the worlds of sport, comedy and music back into our lives" for summer 2020. It features Peter Crouch, Maya Jama, and Alex Horne and The Horne Section, with a range of sporting and entertainment guests, and was aired on BBC1 on Saturday evenings during June–July 2020. The Horne Section contributed various programme jingles and parody songs, including a closing song of appreciation for some of the "unsung heroes" of the lockdown period.

Crouchy's Year-Late Euros: Live (2021)
Crouchy's Year-Late Euros: Live was a late-night entertainment chat show, aired on BBC1 during the UEFA Euro 2020 championships. It featured Peter Crouch, Maya Jama, and Alex Horne and The Horne Section. The band provided music, including various football-related parody songs.

The Horne Section TV Show (2022) 
The Horne Section TV Show is a self-referential comedy about The Horne Section, combining elements of music mockumentary, chat show and sitcom. Mostly scripted (by Alex Horne), the show also includes elements of improvisation, including in the scenes when the band are shown in rehearsal. Songs from the band's repertory are presented both as integral plot devices and as featured music videos, and there is incidental music composed by members of the group (usually pianist Ed Sheldrake). 

The plot shows Horne's attempts to create a successful TV vehicle for the band, leading out of the backstage world of his TV series Taskmaster, where he is frustrated with being regarded as a mere assistant. Alex Horne and the band members play exaggerated versions of themselves (along with Greg Davies and John Oliver), while other actors (including Desiree Burch, Georgia Tennant, Camille Ucan, and Tim Mahendran) play fictional supporting roles. Celebrity guest(s) are invited to the 'chat show' portion as part of the scripted drama. The programme exploits the meta-referential quality of having a nested 'show' with the same name as itself, and makes playful use of devices such as narration, captions, reverse-filming, ironic discrepancies between the fictional 'show' and reality, ambiguities in diegetic music, a crowd-sourced dance sequence, and social media reviews of itself. The first series was released on 3 November 2022, and was broadcast on Channel 4 from 17 November 2022. On 9 January 2023 the show received a nomination at the Comedy.co.uk Awards 2022 in the Best New Sitcom category.

The Horne Section Podcast
The Horne Section Podcast is a musical comedy show featuring The Horne Section and hosted by Alex Horne. Each show features a 'one-person special guest audience' at the recording, typically someone from the world of comedy, music or television. Episodes feature comic songs from Horne and the band, including some about (and/or involving) the guest themselves, as well as music-themed games and comedy.

Series 1 (2018) 

The first series of eight weekly episodes was broadcast in early 2018 and produced in association with the web-based streaming service Deezer. The podcast was listed in the top 10 most streamed podcasts from the Deezer platform in 2018 and named in The Week’s best new podcasts of 2018 list. ('Bonus content' was available in a separate Deezer track for each episode, and any musical bonus content has been listed below after a semicolon.)

Series 2 (2018–19) 

The podcast returned for a double second season in October 2018, running on a fortnightly basis until June 2019. No longer with Deezer, the show was funded by listener donations through Patreon, often in exchange for a specially-written 'dingle' about the contributor (interspersed among the other podcast items) or shorter 'holler' in a regular song. Along with regular guest episodes, special episodes were released for pre-Christmas, Boxing Day, and Pancake Day. During December 2018, the podcast was named in The Guardian’s Top 15 Podcasts of 2018. (Bonus content at the end of episodes has been included.)

Series 3 (2019) 
The third series returned on 11 September 2019, reverting to a weekly eight-episode series. The episodes were preceded by a series 3 trailer on 21 August 2019 featuring the song Summer Banger. In January 2020, the podcast was named Best Music Podcast in the inaugural Podbible Awards, which described the show as: "an absolute joy...manages to blend music with comedy amazingly".

Series 4 (2020) 
Series 4, another eight-episode weekly series, was announced in a short trailer released on 22 January 2020, and ran from Wednesday 29 January until 18 March 2020. The fourth series was immediately followed by Series 5.

The Isolation Specials (Series 5) (2020) 
The 'Isolation Specials' were announced in mid-March 2020 as a response to the Coronavirus concerns growing in the UK, and the consequent necessary postponement of the initial dates in the Horne Section's planned 2020 tour. Although a break in transmission had previously been announced, the first episode appeared only a week after the last of the scheduled episodes of series 4. Episodes were recorded with the band members connected by video link from their own homes, interspersed with clips from a prior telephone call to the guest and pre-recorded songs. Distinctive features of the series include songs put together by individual musicians, musical quizzes by the pianist, and a prominent use of incidental music to underscore conversations.

Series 6 (2020) 

The next series of The Horne Section Podcast was announced by Alex Horne on Twitter on 30 September 2020. The numbering of the series was initially left ambiguous in the band's Patreon post of 1 Oct 2020, where it is referred to as "SERIES 5 (? OR 6?)", but has now been confirmed there to be Series 6 (retroactively making the Isolation Specials officially Series 5 of the podcast). A darker quality was discernible: new regular features included a cover version of any song chosen by the guest for their funeral, the setting of a surreal lyric composed by the guest saying words in alternation with Alex, and a segment that purported to rifle through the contents of celebrities' rubbish bins.

Series 7 (2021) 

Recording of series 7 of The Horne Section Podcast was underway by 9 February 2021, as shown by a picture on the band's Instagram site. Some guests were recommended or invited over Twitter, including comedian/musician Rachel Parris. The series was recorded with the performers 'in isolation' (as with series 5–6), due to ongoing fluctuations in UK lockdown guidance.

The series began on 14 March 2021 with a one-off 'mash-up' combining the podcast with Romesh Ranganathan's music podcast Hip Hop Saved My Life for Comic Relief. A special visual episode livestreamed through Dice followed on 2 April. The series ended without prior announcement at the sixth episode, a curtailed audio version of the Livestream special. Distinctive aspects of this series included songs by 'The Brothers Smooth', developments in the story of Alex's sighting of a UFO, and a continuing trend towards longer and more fully-developed 'dingles' for subscribers.

External links
 The Horne Section Bandcamp page
 The Horne Section Patreon page

References 

British comedy musical groups